In mathematics, a Macbeath region is an explicitly defined region in convex analysis on a bounded convex subset of d-dimensional Euclidean space . Macbeath regions have been used to solve certain complex problems in the study of the boundaries of convex bodies. Recently they have been used in the study of convex approximations and other aspects of computational geometry.

Definition 

Let K be a bounded convex set in a Euclidean space. Given a point x and a scaler λ the λ-scaled the Macbeath region around a point x is:

 

The scaled Macbeath region at x is defined as:

 

This can be seen to be the intersection of K with the reflection of K around x scaled by λ.

Example uses 
 Macbeath regions can be used to create  approximations, with respect to the Hausdorff distance, of convex shapes within a factor of  combinatorial complexity of the lower bound.
 Macbeath regions can be used to approximate balls in the Hilbert metric, e.g. given any convex K, containing an x and a  then:

Properties 

 The  is centrally symmetric around x. 
 Macbeath regions are convex sets.
 If  and  then . Essentially if two Macbeath regions intersect, you can scale one of them up to contain the other. 
 Given a convex body  in canonical form, then any cap of K with width at most  then , where x is the centroid of the base of the cap.
 Given a convex K and some constant , then for any point x in a cap C of K we know . In particular when , we get .
 Given a convex body K, and a cap C of K, if x is in K and   we get .
 Given a small  and a convex  in canonical form, there exists some collection of  centrally symmetric disjoint convex bodies  and caps  such that for some constant  and  depending on d we have:
Each  has width , and 
If C is any cap of width  there must exist an i so that  and

References

Further reading 
 

Metric geometry
Convex analysis
Computational geometry